The Hawaii–Aleutian Time Zone observes Hawaii–Aleutian Standard Time (HST) by subtracting ten hours from Coordinated Universal Time (UTC−10:00). The clock time in this zone is based on the mean solar time of the 150th meridian west of the Greenwich Observatory.

The zone takes its name from the two areas it includes: Hawaii and the portion of Alaska's Aleutian Islands west of 169° 30′ W longitude.

During daylight saving time (DST), the Alaskan portion observes Hawaii–Aleutian Daylight Time (HDT, UTC−09:00), while Hawaii stays on standard time. Hawaii has not observed daylight saving time since September 1945.

From 1900 until 1947, UTC−10:30 was used as standard time in Hawaii.

French Polynesia uses UTC−10:00 for its major cities. The Cook Islands also use the same time. These areas do not use DST. "Hawaii–Aleutian Time Zone" is a U.S. term and for that reason the Polynesian areas are not considered to be a part of the Hawaii–Aleutian Time Zone.

The largest city and metropolitan area in the Hawaii–Aleutian Time Zone are Honolulu and its metropolitan area, respectively.

Major metropolitan areas 
Honolulu, Hawaii
Hilo, Hawaii
Kahului, Hawaii
Kailua-Kona, Hawaii
Kapaa, Hawaii

Other significant places 
Adak Island, Alaska
Johnston Atoll

See also
Time zone
Time offset
Effects of time zones on North American broadcasting

References

External links
HST – Hawaii–Aleutian Standard Time
HDT – Hawaii–Aleutian Daylight Time
The official U.S.  time for the Hawaii–Aleutian time zone (Hawaii) dead link
The official U.S.  time for the Hawaii–Aleutian time zone (Aleutian Islands) dead link
What are the time zones in the United States? (NIST)
Hawaiian-Aleutian zone at Cornell

Time zones
Time zones in the United States